Gforth is a free and portable implementation of the Forth programming language for Unix-like systems, Microsoft Windows, and other operating systems. A primary goal of Gforth is to adhere to the ANS Forth standard. Gforth is free software as part of the GNU Project.

History
The Gforth project was started in mid-1992 by Bernd Paysan and Anton Ertl. Gforth descends from bigFORTH and fig-Forth Gforth is fully ANS FORTH compliant.

References

External links 
 Gforth - Free Software Directory
 

Concatenative programming languages
Forth programming language family
GNU Project software
Free software programmed in C
Free compilers and interpreters
Forth implementations